La Banda ("the band") is a Spanish-language singing competition series created by Ricky Martin and Simon Cowell, and produced by Ricky Martin. It is presented by Alejandra Espinoza and premiered on September 13, 2015. The judges in Season 1 were Ricky Martin, Laura Pausini, and Alejandro Sanz. The goal of the series is to look for talented young teens to make the next musical phenomenon. The show was renewed for season 2.

Auditions for the inaugurative season were held in Los Angeles, Miami, Chicago, Houston, New York and also in Puerto Rico. Season 1 premiered on September 13, 2015, and ended on December 13, 2015. The new band entitled CNCO is composed of (current ages): Christopher Vélez (24), (Ecuador), Richard Camacho (23), (Dominican Republic), Joel Pimentel (21), (Mexico), Erick Brian Colon (19), (Cuba), and Zabdiel de Jesús (22), (Puerto Rico).

Participants 
The young men listed below were voted through to the competition by at least two of the three star judges of the show. Their ages at the time of their televised audition and their Latin American countries of ethnic or national origin are also displayed.

The top 41 participants showed who passed the audition but failed to continue towards the second phase of the competition. The judges decided to form four five-member boy bands to perform during this phase. The fifth five-member boy band was to be made up of five of the participants left behind. After performing, the judges sent all but five boys home. The top 20 shows the participants who moved on to the third round but failed to continue on after that.

Top 41
{| class="wikitable" style="margin: 0 1em 0 0; background: white; border: 1px solid; border-collapse: collapse; font-size: 90%;" width=40%
|-
! width=15% bgcolor="#E8E8E8" | Participant
! width=5%  bgcolor="#E8E8E8" | Age
! width=20% bgcolor="#E8E8E8" | Origin
|-
|Yashua Camacho
| 16
| 
|-
| Franco Tortolani
| 17
| 
|-
| Ezequiel CárdenasJeremías Cárdenas
| 20
|  / 
|-
| Adán Allende
| 24
| 
|-
| Ricardo Moreno
| 16
| 
|-
| Anthony Ortiz
| 17
| 
|-
| Luis Gamarra
| 22
| 
|-
| Diydan López
| 21
| 
|-
| Cristhian Camacho
| 17
| 
|-
|-
| Jorge Gabriel Rodríguez
| 21
| 
|-
| Jordan Hernańdez
| 18
| 
|-
| José López Cepero
| 17
| 
|-
| Mateo Urrea
| 16
| 
|-
| José Barrientos
| 19
| 
|-
| Mauricio Novoa
| 18
| 
|-
| Fabyan Sánchez
| 18
| 
|-
| Brian Gallardo
| 19
| 
|-
| Garmandy Candelario
| 20
| 
|-
| Joseph Picorelli
| 16
| |-
| Felix Gabriel
| 21
| 
|}

Each boy band performed its cover of a song in a music video. After watching the videos, the judges eliminate five more contestants.Top 20Top 15The judges had the top 15 participants performing as a solo artist. The fans are in charge of whose performance was their most favorite.

 Kevin González was originally part of the top 12, but for unknown reasons, Gonzalez decided to quit from the competition. During the first live show it was revealed that Alan Matheus would replace Gonzalez.Top 12Here the 12 finalists that will fight for their goal in the final phase of the competition.

The final 5 that won the competition were Joel Pimentel, Erick Brian Colón, Richard Camacho, Zabdiel de Jesús, and Christopher Vélez

 Results 
 Results summary Contestants' color key:Note: No eliminations occurred during the Week 1 of the live shows, due to the fact that the contestants needed to obtain votes in order for elimination to occur the following week.Note:''' On week seven the judges could not decide who would be the fourth member so the public live votes chose Erick Brian Colon.

Live show details 
Ricky Martin saved Erick Brian Colon.

Week 1 (November 1) 
 Group performance: "La Gozadera"

Week 2 (November 8)

Week 3 (November 15)

Week 4 (November 22) 
 Musical guests: Gente de Zona ft. Marc Anthony – "Traidora" and Becky G – "Break a Sweat"

Week 5 (November 29) 
 Musical guests: Jesse y Joy – "Ecos de Amor" and Calibre 50 – "Contigo"

Week 6: Semi-final (December 6) 
 Musical guests: Reik – "Voy a Olvidarte" / "Inolvidable" and Luis Coronel – "Nada Mas por Eso"

References

External links 

2015 American television seasons